Orion is a fictional superhero appearing in comic books published by DC Comics.

Publication history
Orion first appeared in New Gods #1 (February 1971), and was created by writer/artist Jack Kirby.

Jack Kirby era
Orion originally appeared in New Gods #1 (February–March 1971) which was part of Jack Kirby's Fourth World titles published in the early 1970s. Other titles included in this metaseries were Superman's Pal Jimmy Olsen, Mister Miracle and The Forever People. When the titles were canceled, Orion and his fellow New Gods characters were unseen until DC returned to the Fourth World concept a few years later.

Return of the New Gods
Following an appearance in the final issue of 1st Issue Special, DC revived both the New Gods and Mister Miracle series, continuing the numbering from the original series. The new stories were done without Jack Kirby and featured a number of changes of concept for the character of Orion. The character's "Astro Harness" and trademark helmet were replaced by a more standard superhero costume with a yellow mask. The New Gods title was again canceled in 1978 but the story was wrapped up in two issues of Adventure Comics featuring a "final battle" between Orion and his father, Darkseid. In this battle Darkseid was supposedly annihilated.

This version of Orion returned in a three–issue arc of Justice League of America in which most of the New Gods were captured by the forces of Apokolips. Orion and his fellow New Gods, Metron, Mister Miracle, and Big Barda, summoned the aid of the Justice League and Justice Society to aid them in freeing the forces of New Genesis. This story featured the return, and eventual defeat, of Orion's father.

Post-Crisis
Following the Crisis on Infinite Earths, Orion was featured in the 1989–1990 series New Gods vol. 3 and served a short stint in the Justice League with his friend Lightray during the Keith Giffen/J. M. DeMatteis run. Orion returned as a main character in New Gods vol. 4 which was later relaunched as Jack Kirby's Fourth World. Orion again served as a member of the Justice League during Grant Morrison's tenure on the title, but the character would not receive his own title until 2000.

Orion
Orion was a series penciled and written by Walt Simonson, centered around the eponymous character and which ran for 25 issues (June 2000–June 2002). John Byrne filled in as penciller for the main stories in issues 13 and 14. Issues #1–5 were reprinted by DC Comics in the trade paperback The Gates of Apokolips. Also included as reprints were portions from the Secret Origins of Super-Villains 80-Page Giant #1 and the Legends of the DC Universe 80-Page Giant #2.

A backup that ran consistently in the Orion book was "Tales of the New Gods". Simonson invited fellow artists and writers to provide a short story often supplementing the issue's main action.

Fictional character biography

Orion is the second son of Darkseid, dictator of Apokolips. He is the half-brother of Kalibak and Grayven. He later marries Bekka, the daughter of Apokolips Resistance leader Himon. As a child, Orion was traded to New Genesis' benevolent leader Highfather for Scott Free, Highfather's own son, in The (peace) Pact between New Genesis and Apokolips. Raised as the son of Highfather Izaya, under his loving care, Orion was taught to control and focus his rage, and Orion grew to deeply value his adoptive home and its ideals. This path to maturity was not an easy task given that his heritage boiled with the rage of the brutal and merciless Darkseid. Learning how to control that dark nature consumed much of Orion's youth. However, on top of his adoptive parent's care, his friends among the New Gods, particularly Lightray, helped him channel his Dark Side toward the protection of his adopted homeworld New Genesis. As a result of that personal struggle, Orion's inherited traits and learned focus allowed Orion to become the most powerful warrior and hero of New Genesis. His fighting skill, stamina, relentlessness, and ruthlessness have earned him the nickname "The Dog of War", who still occasionally needs the aid of his Mother Box to help control his emotions when they threaten to get the better of him. Orion counts among his closest friends Lightray, Metron, Jezebelle, Scott Free, Big Barda, and Forager.

The 25–issue Walt Simonson series was designed to follow the continuity of the original Fourth World series and was published after John Byrne's Jack Kirby's Fourth World series ended. To flesh out the series, characters such as Fourth World stalwarts Lightray, Darkseid, Desaad, and Kalibak were used in addition to lesser used characters such as Orion's mother Tigra (early on in the series), Mortalla, and the Newsgroup Legion (an update of Jack Kirby's 1940s Newsboy Legion). A collection of all Walt Simonson's Orion stories was released in July 2018.

During Simonson's series, Orion was able to obtain the Anti-Life Equation, a mathematical equation stating that "there is no free will, only Darkseid". Darkseid has coveted the Anti-Life Equation for aeons to take complete control of the entire Multiverse. Orion's mother lied to him about Darkseid not being his father. He then went to Apokolips and confronted Darkseid about his parentage. They fought for control of Apokolips with Orion refusing to use the Anti-Life Equation as a matter of pride and his warrior's code. He defeated Darkseid and gained control of Apokolips. With the Anti-Life Equation, Orion went to Earth to begin creating intergalactic peace. He used the Anti-Life Equation to turn Earth into a utopian world by usurping all free will and following only his guidance. The lack of free will began disrupting the balance of the Multiverse as Earth is the linchpin holding it all together. It was then revealed that Darkseid, with guidance from Metron, allowed Orion to defeat him. They planned the defeat so that Darkseid could understand the potential of the Anti-Life Equation.

Orion has served two terms with the Justice League. He first demanded to join the League alongside his friend Lightray. They were accepted as Leaguers and stayed on until after the battle with the Evil Eye. Later, Orion and Big Barda were sent as agents of New Genesis to serve in the JLA. During his time in the League, Orion helped to defeat Starro when its actions put almost the entirety of North America to sleep and aided Green Lantern, Steel, Plastic Man, and Barda in capturing a White Martian that had regained its original memory. On one occasion, Orion and other Leaguers were abducted by the temporarily insane Adam Strange as part of a plot to defeat a telepathic race. Steel, John Henry Irons was forced to steal Orion's Mother Box and use it as a telepathic shield. Orion was enraged that his Mother Box was devoting to much energy and focus in keeping him calm to do anything else. Orion and Barda's central mission was to help mobilize Earth's heroes against the coming of the omnipotent, Old God tech-cosmic weapon known as Mageddon. Orion gave his Mother Box to Oracle for safe-keeping while he confronted Mageddon at full ferocity; channeling his inherited fury from Darkseid. Oracle used it to set up a telepathic, online network that could coordinate Earth's defending heroes as they fought to stop wars that Mageddon's mind controlling presence was inciting. Once Mageddon was defeated, Orion and Barda resigned from the Justice League.

Years later, Orion returns to Earth via Boom Tube for his final battle with Darkseid. During the celestial fight, Orion ultimately kills Darkseid by ripping his heart out. This created a firepit, like those on Apokolips, from Darkseid's chest cavity and fulfilling the prophecy of their final battle. As Darkseid dies, a battered, wounded Orion walks away from the battlefield having "won" the battle against his father once and for all.

Darkseid's life essence endured the death of his body and fell back in time and space; fracturing both as he fell toward his own personal Hell inside a black hole at the center of creation. As Darkseid fell, his essence was briefly reborn on Earth as Boss Dark Side. Darkseid's Elite had been killed as well and their essences possessed human bodies as well. Using the super-villain Libra, Darkseid successfully unleashed the Anti-Life Equation onto humanity and in the process, dragged Earth outside time and space, threatening the entire multiverse in the process. From this point, Darkseid sought his revenge against
Orion by firing a time travel-based gun backwards in time to kill Orion once and for all. The bullet killed Orion, who by this point had realized that his father and his fellow evil New Gods still lived and were now possessing human beings as host bodies. With his last strength, Orion warns the man who finds his dying body, Detective Dan "Terrible" Turpin, that "They are not dead - He is in you all". His final command, appropriate for the Dog of War, is for humanity to "Fight..." before he finally dies.

Darkseid's murder of his son would ultimately backfire on him. Green Lantern John Stewart would recover the bullet that was used to kill Orion and give it to Batman, who would ultimately be forced to mortally wound Darkseid with the very same bullet Darkseid used to kill his own son, an irony that Superman pointed out when he described the murder of Orion as "suicide" on Darkseid's part, due to the fate of the bullet.

While many of the Gods from New Genesis were reborn following Final Crisis, Orion is not among them. Metron is seen standing over his astro-harness in effigy.

The New 52 
In The New 52, a 2011 reboot of the DC Comics universe, Orion has appeared as a supporting character in the Wonder Woman title. After consulting with the Source, he first joins Wonder Woman in her search for a child which was abducted by the gods of Olympia.

DC Rebirth 
Orion appears in the "Mister Miracle" (2018) series by Tom King and Mitch Gerads in an antagonistic role to the hero, Mister Miracle. He is later killed by Darkseid. However, the reality of this story is questionable whether or not the events in the book truly took place or are canon.

Orion also appears in the Justice League Odyssey series, rescuing the Green Lantern, Jessica Cruz, after she is killed by Darkseid. Initially he is under the guise of Okkult until the ruse is discovered and he continues to appear as Orion.

Powers and abilities
Orion belongs to an extraterrestrial race of supernatural immortals known as the New Gods. As a New God, he possesses the standard superhuman attributes of strength, speed, stamina and durability on par with his father Darkseid as well as with Superman; being virtually indestructible, able to run at supersonic speeds up to orbital speed, and lift weights exceeding 100 tons. Although he is a highly skilled warrior, noted for a fierce warrior's instinct, his great rage and inner turmoil makes him impulsive and prone to violent, almost psychotic outbursts as he has inherited much of his father's darkness. He has access to a Mother Box that can calm his temper and change his appearance, "smoothing" out his coarse features. In addition, Orion possesses a regenerative healing factor, and is able to call upon his Mother Box to assist in healing injuries or to sustain his life energies. Like all other New Gods, Orion is vulnerable to a substance called Radion. The "Astro-Harness" is an alien artifact of unknown origin, capable of self-repair; flight at light speed; interstellar teleportation; energy projection and absorption; force field generation; and possesses a tractor beam. Orion's wristbands are virtually indestructible.

Orion is able to harness an interdimensional energy called the "Astro Force". While Orion himself is a conduit for the Astro Force, he can use either the Astro Harness or his Astro Wristbands as a valve through which he can project this energy. He uses the Astro Force primarily as a weapon, but once he was shown to be able to use the Astro Force to create an energy shield powerful enough to deflect Darkseid's otherwise unstoppable "Omega Effect". Like his father and all members of the Fourth World, Orion is immortal.

Other versions

In addition to his mainstream incarnation, Orion has been depicted in other alternative universes:
 In the graphic novel Kingdom Come, Orion has overthrown Darkseid and is the reluctant ruler of Apokolips, and he had tried to run it as a democratic world with little success. His aged and battle-scarred appearance is similar to that of his father's, and he finally gains full control of his emotions.
 In the Mister Miracle series of Grant Morrison's Seven Soldiers, Orion is a large, muscular African-American man, seen pushing Metron's wheelchair.
 In the satirical miniseries Captain Carrot and the Final Ark, Orion is a dog named Orihound.
 In the Tangent Comics imprint, Orion is a superpowered being with transwarp powers that allow him to transport himself, others and objects anywhere on earth. He can transport beings across the Bleed into other universes with the aid of an additional power source such as Green Lantern Power Rings. He currently aids the Superman of Earth-9.

In other media

Television

 Orion appears in series set in the DC Animated Universe (DCAU):
 He first appears in the Superman: The Animated Series two-part episode "Apokolips...Now!", voiced by Steve Sandor. He arrives on Earth to warn Superman of Darkseid's impending invasion and helps him thwart it before telling Darkseid that Earth is under Highfather's protection and any attack will be considered a breach of the peace treaty between Apokolips and New Genesis.
 Orion appears in Justice League, voiced by Ron Perlman. In the episode "Twilight", he assists the Justice League after Darkseid forms an alliance with Brainiac. Orion also makes a cameo appearance in the episode "Hereafter".
 Orion appears in Justice League Unlimited, voiced again by Ron Perlman. As of this series, he has joined the Justice League.
 A plush toy of Orion appears in the Teen Titans Go! episode "Robin Backwards".
 Orion appears in Young Justice, voiced by Ben Diskin. This version is autistic.

Film
An alternate universe version of Orion appears in flashbacks depicted in Justice League: Gods and Monsters, voiced by Josh Keaton. This version grew up as royalty on Apokolips and was to be married to Bekka of New Genesis ostensibly as part of a peace treaty between their planets. Before the ceremony, he gives her an indestructible sword equipped with a Mother Box as a wedding gift. After getting married however, Bekka tries to convince Orion to leave with her before her family slaughters his. Orion attempts to help, but is killed by Highfather, which inspires Bekka to leave and eventually become her universe's Wonder Woman.

Video games
 Orion appears in DC Universe Online.
 Orion appears as a playable character in Lego Batman 3: Beyond Gotham, voiced by Nolan North.
 Orion appears as a playable character in Lego DC Super-Villains, voiced by Roger Craig Smith.

References

External links
 Cosmic Teams: Orion 
 DCU Guide: Orion
 Fastbak: Orion
 Index to the Earth-1 Fourth World stories

Fictional princes
Characters created by Jack Kirby
Comics characters introduced in 1971
Comics by Walt Simonson
DC Comics characters who can teleport
DC Comics characters who can move at superhuman speeds
DC Comics characters with accelerated healing
DC Comics characters with superhuman strength
DC Comics deities
DC Comics American superheroes
DC Comics male superheroes
DC Comics titles
Fictional characters with absorption or parasitic abilities
Fictional characters with energy-manipulation abilities 
Fictional characters with immortality
Fictional humanoids
Fourth World (comics)
New Gods of Apokolips
New Gods of New Genesis
Superheroes who are adopted